The Sapphic stanza, named after Sappho, is an Aeolic verse form of four lines. Originally composed in quantitative verse and unrhymed, since the Middle Ages imitations of the form typically feature rhyme and accentual prosody. It is "the longest lived of the Classical lyric strophes in the West".

Definitions

In poetry, "Sapphic" may refer to three distinct but related Aeolic verse forms:

 The greater Sapphic, a 15-syllable line, with the structure: – u – – – | u u – | – u u – u – – –=long syllable; u=short syllable; |=caesura
 The lesser Sapphic, an 11-syllable line, with the structure: – u – x – u u – u – – x=anceps (either long or short)
 The Sapphic stanza, typically conceptualized as comprising 3 lesser Sapphic lines followed by an adonic, with the structure: – u u – –

Classical Latin poets duplicated the Sapphic stanza with subtle modification.

Since the Middle Ages the terms "Sapphic stanzas" or frequently simply "Sapphics" have come to denote various stanzaic forms approaching more or less closely to Classical Sapphics, but often featuring accentual meter or rhyme (neither occurring in the original form), and with line structures mirroring the original with varying levels of fidelity.

Aeolic Greek

Alcaeus of Mytilene composed in, and may have invented, the Sapphic stanza, but it is his contemporary and compatriot Sappho whose example exerted the greatest influence, and for whom the verseform is now named. Both lived around 600 BCE on the island of Lesbos and wrote in the Aeolic dialect of Greek.

The original Aeolic verse takes the form of a 3-line stanza:

However, these stanzas are frequently analyzed as 4 lines, thus:

While Sappho used several metrical forms for her poetry, she is most famous for the Sapphic stanza. Her poems in this meter (collected in Book I of the ancient edition) ran to 330 stanzas, a significant part of her complete works, and of her surviving poetry: fragments 1-42.

Sappho's most famous poem in this metre is Sappho 31, which begins as follows:

(In this stanza, all anceps positions are filled with long syllables.) Transliteration and formal equivalent paraphrase (substituting English stress for Greek length):

Latin

Classical

A few centuries later, the Roman poet Catullus admired Sappho's work and used the Sapphic stanza in two poems: Catullus 11 (commemorating the end of his affair with Clodia) and Catullus 51 (marking its beginning). The latter is a free translation of Sappho 31.

Horace wrote several of his Odes in Sapphics, and two tendencies of Catullus became normative practice with Horace: the occurrence of a caesura after the fifth syllable; and the fourth syllable (formerly anceps) becoming habitually long. Horace's Odes became the chief models for subsequent Sapphics, whether in Latin or the later vernaculars — hence the term "Horatian Sapphic" for this modified model. But due to linguistic change, Horace's imitators split on whether they imitated his quantitative structure (the long and short syllables, Horace's metrical foundation), or his accentual patterns (the stressed or unstressed syllables which were somewhat ordered, but not determinative of Horace's actual formal structure). Gasparov provides this double scansion of Ode 1.22 (lines 1-4), which also displays Horace's typical long forth syllables and caesura after the fifth:

 /  × ×   / ×        × × /  ×   / ×
 –  u –   – –        u u –  u   – ∩
     
 
  ×  / ×   /  ×     / × ×    ×    /  ×
  –  u –   –  –     u u –    u    –  –
   
 
  ×   × × / ×        / × ×  × /  ×
  –   u – – –        u u –  u –  –
     
 
     /  ×    × /  ×
     –  u    u –  –
    ...
 
 /=stressed syllable; ×=unstressed syllable; ∩=brevis in longo

Other ancient poets who used the Sapphic stanza are Statius (in Silvae 4.7), Prudentius, Ausonius, Paulinus of Nola and Venantius Fortunatus (once in Carmina 10.7).

Usually, the lesser Sapphic line is found only within the Sapphic stanza; however, both Seneca the Younger (in his Hercules Oetaeus) and Boethius used the line in extended passages (thus resembling the stichic quality of blank verse more than a stanzaic lyric).

Medieval

The Sapphic stanza was one of the few classical quantitative meters to survive into the Middle Ages, when accentual rather than quantitative prosody became the norm. Many Latin hymns were written in Sapphic stanzas, including the famous hymn for John the Baptist which gave the original names of the sol-fa scale:

Accentual Sapphic stanzas that ignore Classical Latin vowel quantities are also attested, as in the 11th-century Carmen Campidoctoris, which stresses the 1st, 4th and 10th syllables of the lines while keeping the Horatian caesura after the fifth (here with a formal equivalent paraphrase):

English

Though some English poets attempted quantitative effects in their verse, quantity is not phonemic in English. So imitations of the Sapphic stanza are typically structured by replacing long with stressed syllables, and short with unstressed syllables (and often additional alterations, as exemplified below).

The Sapphic stanza was imitated in English, using a line articulated into three sections (stressed on syllables 1, 5, and 10) as the Greek and Latin would have been, by Algernon Charles Swinburne in a poem he simply called "Sapphics":

Thomas Hardy chose to open his first verse collection Wessex Poems and other verses 1898 with "The Temporary the All", a poem in Sapphics, perhaps as a declaration of his skill and as an encapsulation of his personal experience.

Rudyard Kipling wrote a tribute to William Shakespeare in Sapphics called "The Craftsman". He hears the line articulated into four, with stresses on syllables 1, 4, 6, and 10 (called a "schoolboy error" by classical scholar L. P. Wilkinson, arising from a misunderstanding of Horace's regularisation of the 4th syllable as a long and his frequent use of the 5th-element caesura in his Sapphics). His poem begins:

Allen Ginsberg also experimented with the form:

The Oxford classicist Armand D'Angour has created mnemonics to illustrate the difference between Sapphics heard as a four-beat line (as in Kipling) versus the three-beat measure, as follows:

Notable contemporary Sapphic poems include "Sapphics for Patience" by Annie Finch, "Dusk: July" by Marilyn Hacker, "Buzzing Affy" (a translation of "An Ode to Aphrodite") by Adam Lowe, and "Sapphics Against Anger" by Timothy Steele.

Other languages

Written in Latin, the Sapphic stanza was already one of the most popular verseforms of the Middle Ages, but Renaissance poets began composing Sapphics in several vernacular languages, preferring Horace as their model above their immediate Medieval Latin predecessors.

Leonardo Dati composed the first Italian Sapphics in 1441, followed by Galeotto del Carretto, Claudio Tolomei, and others.

The Sapphic stanza has been very popular in Polish literature since the 16th century. It was used by many poets. Sebastian Klonowic wrote a long poem, using the form. The formula of 11/11/11/5 syllables was so attractive that it can be found in other forms, among others the Słowacki stanza: 11a/11b/11a/5b/11c/11c.

In 1653, Paul Gerhardt used the Sapphic strophe format in the text of his sacred morning song "Lobet den Herren alle, die ihn ehren". Sapphic stanza was often used in poetry of German Humanism and Baroque. It is also used in hymns such as "Herzliebster Jesu" by Johann Heermann. In the 18th century, amidst a resurgence of interest in Classical versification, Friedrich Gottlieb Klopstock wrote unrhymed Sapphics, regularly moving the position of the dactyl.

Esteban Manuel de Villegas wrote Sapphics in Spanish in the 17th century.

Miquel Costa i Llobera wrote Catalan Sapphics in the late 19th century, in his book of poems in the manner of Horace, called Horacianes.

Notes

References
Main
 
 
 
 
 
 
 
 
 
 
Verse specimens

External links

 http://www.aoidoi.org/articles/meter/intro.pdf
 https://digitalsappho.org/fragments-2/
 

Stanzaic form
Sappho